Kock is a town in eastern Poland

Kock may also refer to:

Gmina Kock, urban/rural district in Poland
Kock pouch
Kock (surname)

See also

Melissa Köck